Toronto has several shopping malls across the city, including five major destination malls that are among the largest and profitable in Canada. The first enclosed shopping mall in Toronto was the Toronto Arcade in the downtown core. The first shopping mall of the enclosed, automobile-centred design type was Yorkdale Shopping Centre, which opened in 1964.

Major shopping centres
Toronto's five major shopping centres each have over one hundred stores and are anchored by multiple department stores, international brands and luxury retailers. They are also the five largest malls in Toronto by floor space. Each provides thousands of automobile parking spaces. With the exception of Sherway Gardens, all of these malls have direct pedestrian connections with the Toronto subway system, though Sherway Gardens has a bus terminal connecting Toronto Transit Commission and MiWay bus routes. Yorkdale Shopping Centre is Toronto's first of its kind and was the world's largest shopping mall at the time of opening, while Toronto Eaton Centre is the most visited shopping mall in North America. These five malls were completed within a 13-year span in the 1960s and 1970s. The five malls are owned by either Cadillac Fairview or Oxford Properties, two of Canada's largest commercial real estate investment companies. A sixth major mall is planned by Cadillac Fairview in Toronto's planned East Harbour neighbourhood by the intersection of Don Valley Parkway and Gardiner Expressway/Lake Shore Boulevard and be also served by the East Harbour station on the Ontario Line.

District or neighbourhood shopping centres
The district or neighbourhood level of shopping centres in Toronto are typically built around one or a few department stores or grocery supermarkets and are enclosed. These shopping centres typically provide a surrounding free parking lot. Most of these are located in the suburbs of Toronto, where land was available for parking. There are only two shopping malls of this type within Toronto's pre-1998 city limits: Dufferin Mall (on Dufferin Street south of Bloor Street and north of College Street) and Gerrard Square (on Gerrard Street East east of Pape Avenue and west of Jones Avenue). The third shopping mall in Old Toronto, Galleria Shopping Centre (at Dufferin Street and Dupont Street), was demolished in January 2020. There are a few ethnic malls of this type as well.

 Agincourt Mall (Kennedy Road and Sheppard Avenue East), Scarborough
 Albion Centre (Finch Avenue West and Kipling Avenue), Etobicoke
 Bayview Village Shopping Centre (Bayview Avenue and Sheppard Avenue East), North York
 Bridlewood Mall (Warden Avenue and Finch Avenue East), Scarborough
 Cedarbrae Mall (Lawrence Avenue East and Markham Road), Scarborough
 Centerpoint Mall (Yonge Street and Steeles Avenue West), North York
 Cloverdale Mall (Dundas Street West and The East Mall), Etobicoke
 Dufferin Mall (Dufferin Street, south of Bloor Street West and north of College Street), Old Toronto
 East York Town Centre (Millwood Road and Overlea Boulevard), East York
 Eglinton Square Shopping Centre (Eglinton Avenue East and Victoria Park Avenue), Scarborough
 Gerrard Square (Gerrard Street East and Pape Avenue), Old Toronto
 Jane-Finch Mall (Jane and Finch), North York
 Kipling-Queensway Mall (Kipling Avenue and the Queensway), Etobicoke
 Lawrence Allen Centre (formerly Lawrence Square Shopping Centre; renamed in late 2019) (Allen Road and Lawrence Avenue West), North York
 Malvern Town Centre (Neilson Road and Tapscott Road), Scarborough
 North York Sheridan Mall (Jane Street and Wilson Avenue), North York
 Parkway Mall (Victoria Park Avenue and Ellesmere Road), Scarborough
 Woodbine Centre (Rexdale Boulevard and Highway 27), Etobicoke
 Woodside Square (McCowan Road and Finch Avenue East), Scarborough

Ethnic malls
 Dragon Centre (Sheppard Avenue East and Glen Watford Drive), Scarborough
 Splendid China Mall (Steeles Avenue east of Kennedy Road), Scarborough; converted from Canadian Tire

Malls located within major office buildings and condominium towers

One configuration of shopping mall in Toronto is the self-contained type located within a commercial office building, sometimes around a central atrium. This type typically does not provide a surrounding parking lot. These malls typically house from a dozen to several dozen stores. Most of these are connected to a station of the Toronto subway system. In the case of the Hudson's Bay Centre, the mall connects the department store to the Toronto subway system at Bloor–Yonge station. Some of these malls can be located in the taller condominium towers. These malls are located in the core (Old Toronto), unless marked otherwise:
 The Atrium on Bay (Dundas Street West and Yonge Street)
 Aura (Yonge Street and Gerrard Street); mixed-use with retail on the first four floors and the first basement
 Canada Square (Yonge Street and Eglinton Avenue West)
 Chinatown Centre (Chinatown); ethnic mall
 College Park (Yonge Street and College Street)
 The Crossways (Bloor Street West and Dundas Street West)
 Cumberland Terrace (Bay Street and Bloor Street West)
 Dragon City (Chinatown) (Dundas Street West and Spadina Avenue); ethnic mall
 Dynasty Centre (Sheppard Avenue East and Midland Avenue), Scarborough; ethnic mall
 Empress Walk (Empress Avenue and Yonge Street), North York
 Holt Renfrew Centre (Bloor Street West and Bay Street)
 Hudson's Bay Centre (Bloor Street West and Yonge Street)
 Manulife Centre (Bloor Street West and Bay Street)
 Queen's Quay Terminal (Queen's Quay West and York Street)
 Sheppard Centre (Sheppard Avenue East and Yonge Street), North York
 Yonge Eglinton Centre (Yonge Street and Eglinton Avenue West)
 Yorkville Village (formerly Hazelton Lanes) (Avenue Road and Yorkville Avenue)
 York Mills Centre (York Mills Road and Yonge Street), North York

Path underground shopping complex

In Downtown Toronto, primarily in the Financial District, there are interconnected shopping malls located at least one flight of stairs underground. The complex as a whole is named 'Path'. The Toronto Eaton Centre (see above) is connected to the complex.

 Bay Adelaide Centre (Bay Street and Adelaide Street West)
 Brookfield Place (bounded by Front Street West, Bay Street, Wellington Street West, and Yonge Street)
 Commerce Court (Yonge Street and King Street West)
 First Canadian Place (Bay Street and King Street West)
 Metro Hall (John Street and King Street West)
 Royal Bank Plaza (Bay Street and Front Street West)
 Scotia Plaza (King Street West and Yonge Street)
 Sheraton Centre (Queen Street West and York Street)
 Simcoe Place (Front Street West and Simcoe Street)
 Toronto-Dominion Centre (bounded by King Street West, Bay Street, Wellington Street West, and York Street)
 Union Station (Bay Street and Front Street West)

Open-air shopping plazas
Open-air shopping plazas are larger collections of stores built with surrounding parking areas, with parking spaces separated from the storefronts by sidewalks. These shopping centres generally serve the local surrounding area and have a large proportion of family-run businesses, some of which serve ethnic communities.

 Bamburgh Gardens (Warden Avenue and Bamburgh Circle), Scarborough
 Chartwell Plaza (Brimley Road and Huntingwood Drive), Scarborough
 Dufferin & Steeles Plaza, North York
 Dufferin Business Centre (Dufferin Street between Castlefield Avenue and the former York–North York boundary), York
 Iranian Plaza (Yonge Street between Cummer Avenue and Steeles Avenue), North York; ethnic mall
 Lawrence Plaza (Bathurst Street and Lawrence Avenue West), North York
 Milliken Wells Plaza (McCowan Road and Alton Towers Circle), Scarborough
 Peanut Plaza (Don Mills Road and Van Horne Avenue), North York
 Sheppard Plaza (Sheppard Avenue West and Bathurst Street), North York
 Shops at Don Mills (Don Mills Road and Lawrence Avenue East), North York
 Sunnybrook Plaza (Eglinton Avenue East and Bayview Avenue), East York
 Tam O'Shanter Plaza (Sheppard Avenue East east of Kennedy Road), Scarborough
 The Landmark (Steeles Avenue and Middlefield Road), Scarborough; ethnic mall
 Victoria Terrace (Victoria Park Avenue and Lawrence Avenue East), North York
 Whiteshield Plaza (Kennedy Road and Lawrence Avenue East), Scarborough
 York Mills Gardens (Leslie Street and York Mills Road), North York

Power centres
Power centres mainly consist of major national and international big-box stores with large amounts of parking space separate from the stores themselves, and which serve a larger area than the open-air shopping plazas do.

 Black Creek Super Value Centre (Rogers Road and Keele Street), York
 Crossroads (Weston Road and Highway 401), North York
 Downsview Power Centre (unofficial name) (Dufferin Street and Wilson Avenue), North York
 Dufferin and Steeles Power Centre (unofficial name) (Dufferin Street and Steeles Avenue), North York
 Golden Mile (Eglinton Avenue East between Victoria Park Avenue and Birchmount Road), Scarborough
 Kennedy Commons (Kennedy Road and Highway 401), Scarborough
 Leaside Centre (Eglinton Avenue East and Laird Drive), East York
 Shoppers World Danforth (Danforth Avenue west of Victoria Park Avenue), East York
 Queenswalk Centre (North Queen Street and Queensway), Etobicoke
 Queensway Complex (Islington Avenue and Queensway), Etobicoke
 Stock Yards Village (Weston Road and St. Clair Avenue West), Old Toronto

Flea markets
The markets are housed indoors with stalls of independent vendors.
 Downsview Park Merchant's Market, Downsview Park (Keele Street and Sheppard Avenue West), North York
 Dr. Flea's, Highway 27 and Albion Road, Etobicoke
 Jane Finch Flea Market, 1911 Finch Avenue West (Jane Street and Finch Avenue West), North York
 Merchant's Flea Market, 1921 Eglinton Avenue East, (Warden Avenue and Eglinton Avenue East), Scarborough

Former shopping malls
The following shopping malls have been demolished or closed. Some have been replaced by new strip plazas or re-developed for non-retail uses:

 The original Yonge Street Arcade (1884–1954) at 137 Yonge Street and consisting of 52 stores was considered Canada's first indoor mall. It was demolished in 1954 following two fires and was replaced in 1960 by the Arcade Building, which had a similar arcade-style concourse on its main floor until 2008 when the floor was redeveloped with the arcade being replaced with a fitness centre and offices.
 Galleria Shopping Centre (Dufferin Street and Dupont Street), Old Toronto; demolition began in January 2020.
 Golden Mile Plaza (1954–1986) at Eglinton Avenue East and Victoria Park Avenue, demolished after the 1986 fire and later replaced with a power centre named Golden Mile Mall.
 Morningside Mall (1979–2007) at Morningside Avenue and Kingston Road, Scarborough; the indoor mall was demolished to make way for an outdoor big box plaza called Morningside Crossing
 Northtown Shopping Centre (1950s-2000s) - located at 5421 Yonge and built on part of Cummer Pioneer Cemetery (north Parr along Yonge) and demolished and replaced by condominium complex (Delmanor Northtown).
 Rexdale Plaza (1957–2004), Islington Avenue and Rexdale Boulevard, Etobicoke and enclosed in 1972. Most stores closed by 2003 and demolition of south end in 2004 with north end of mall retained (with an Asian supermarket and a few small stores). Since 2004, its south end was redeveloped as an outdoor mall with Wal-Mart Supercentre as a stand-alone big box store.
 Warden Woods Mall or Warden Power Centre (1981–2005) at Warden Avenue north of St. Clair Avenue East near Warden station, Scarborough was a full mall with three anchor stores (The Bay, Simpson's and a Knob Hill Farms grocery store) and later as clearance centre. It has since been demolished and replaced with townhouses.
 Weston-Finch Mall (1960s–2006), Weston Road and Finch Avenue West, North York — former strip mall (with Zellers, Canadian Tire and McDonald's as tenants) and later as outlet facility; demolished 2006 and vacant lot awaiting redevelopment for rental apartments.
  Westside Mall, Eglinton Avenue West west of Caledonia Road, York — replaced with a power centre of the same name during the early 2000s (with Canadian Tire, Rogers Wireless (originally Rogers Video then Rogers Plus), FreshCo (renamed from Price Chopper), Dollar Tree (formerly occupied by Shoppers Drug Mart) and CIBC as major tenants) and will be connected to Caledonia station of both GO Transit's Barrie line and the Toronto subway system's Line 5 Eglinton in 2023 at the earliest.
 Honeydale Mall (1973–2013): Located in Eatonville neighbourhood of Toronto; officially closed on 28 June 2013.

Former flea markets
 Flea market at the southwest corner of Midland Avenue and Sheppard Avenue East is closed since the early 2000s and the property was to be redeveloped concurrent with the Sheppard East LRT's construction; the construction of the LRT was cancelled; LRT very likely to be replaced with Line 4 extension.
 Dufferin and Steeles Flea Market, replaced with The Home Depot.
 Toronto Weston Flea Market, Old Weston Road and St. Clair Avenue West, Old Toronto (later relocated to a much smaller site nearby on St. Clair Avenue West at Hounslow Heath Road between Old Weston Road and GO Transit's Barrie line)

See also

 List of largest shopping malls in Canada
 List of shopping malls in Canada

References

 
Toronto
Shopping malls
shopping malls